Mount Pleasant is an unincorporated community in Union Township, Perry County, in the U.S. state of Indiana.

History

A post office was established at Mount Pleasant in 1869, and remained in operation until 1943. The community was so named for its lofty elevation.

Geography

References

Unincorporated communities in Perry County, Indiana
Unincorporated communities in Indiana